Nicole Leistenschneider (born 10 May 1967) is a German sprinter. She competed in the women's 4 × 400 metres relay at the 1984 Summer Olympics, representing West Germany.

References

External links
 

1967 births
Living people
Athletes (track and field) at the 1984 Summer Olympics
German female sprinters
Olympic athletes of West Germany
Athletes from Toronto
Olympic female sprinters